The Master of Nuremberg is a 1927 German silent historical comedy film directed by Ludwig Berger and starring Rudolf Rittner, Max Gülstorff and Gustav Fröhlich. It is based on the 1868 opera Die Meistersinger von Nürnberg by Richard Wagner. It was considered artistically unsuccessful because of its overly theatrical presentation. It is also known by the alternative title The Meistersinger.

The film's sets were designed by the art director Rudolf Bamberger.

After completing the film Berger emigrated to work in Hollywood, although he later returned to Germany.

Cast

 Rudolf Rittner as Hans Sachs
 Max Gülstorff as Veit Pogner
 Gustav Fröhlich as Walter von Stolzing
 Julius Falkenstein as Beckmesser
 Veit Harlan as David
 Maria Matray
 Elsa Wagner
 Hans Wassmann
 Hermann Picha

References

Bibliography
 Hermanni, Horst O. Von Dorothy Dandridge bis Willy Fritsch: Das Film ABC, Volume 2. Books on Demand, 2009.
 Manvell, Robert. Experiment in the Film. Arno Press, 1949.

External links

1927 films
Films of the Weimar Republic
German silent feature films
Films based on works by Richard Wagner
Films directed by Ludwig Berger
Films set in the Holy Roman Empire
Films set in the 16th century
German black-and-white films
German historical comedy films
1920s historical comedy films
Phoebus Film films
1927 comedy films
Silent historical comedy films
1920s German films
1920s German-language films